The 1996 Pontiac Excitement 400 was the third stock car race of the 1996 NASCAR Winston Cup Series and the 42nd iteration of the event. The race was held on Sunday, March 3, 1996, in Richmond, Virginia, at Richmond International Raceway, a 0.75 miles (1.21 km) D-shaped oval. The race took the scheduled 400 laps to complete. On the final restart with five to go, Hendrick Motorsports driver Jeff Gordon would manage to pull away from the field to secure his 10th career NASCAR Winston Cup Series victory and his first of the season. To fill out the top three, Robert Yates Racing driver Dale Jarrett and Roush Racing driver Ted Musgrave would finish second and third, respectively.

Background 

Richmond International Raceway (RIR) is a 3/4-mile (1.2 km), D-shaped, asphalt race track located just outside Richmond, Virginia in Henrico County. It hosts the Monster Energy NASCAR Cup Series and Xfinity Series. Known as "America's premier short track", it formerly hosted a NASCAR Camping World Truck Series race, an IndyCar Series race, and two USAC sprint car races.

Entry list 

 (R) denotes rookie driver.

Qualifying 
Qualifying was split into two rounds. The first round was held on Friday, March 1, at 10:30 AM EST. Each driver would have one lap to set a time. During the first round, the top 25 drivers in the round would be guaranteed a starting spot in the race. If a driver was not able to guarantee a spot in the first round, they had the option to scrub their time from the first round and try and run a faster lap time in a second round qualifying run, held on Saturday, March 2, at 11:30 AM EST. As with the first round, each driver would have one lap to set a time. For this specific race, positions 26-36 would be decided on time, and depending on who needed it, a select amount of positions were given to cars who had not otherwise qualified but were high enough in owner's points.

Three drivers would fail to qualify: Randy MacDonald, Robbie Faggart, and Dick Trickle.

Full qualifying results 

*Time not available.

Race results

References 

1996 NASCAR Winston Cup Series
NASCAR races at Richmond Raceway
March 1996 sports events in the United States
1996 in sports in Virginia